The Nzema are an Akan people numbering about 328,700, of whom 262,000 live in southwestern Ghana and 66,700 live in the southeast of Côte d'Ivoire. In Ghana the Nzema area is divided into three electoral districts: Nzema East Municipal, also known as Evalue Gwira; Ellembele; and Nzema West, also known as Jomoro. Their language is also known as Nzima or Appolo.  

The Nzema are mostly farmers. According to their traditional calendar, days are ordered in cycles of seven, and these follow each other in a three-week cycle. They have a matrilineal kinship system, with descent and property passed through the maternal lines. 

A religious Kundum Festival is held annually all over the Ahanta and Nzema areas. Its start is timed to coordinate with the harvest period, so local communities determine when that will be. It begins in the easternmost part of Ahanta and advances southwestward together with the harvest period. Ritual drumming, singing and dancing take place for four weeks, and are considered the way the community expels devils and protects its good fortune. This festival is the main occasion on which the satirical avudewene songs are performed by young men.

Notable people
 Kwame Nkrumah (1909 – 1972), pan-Africanist.
 Anton Wilhelm Amo (c. 1703 — c. 1759), African-born German philosopher.
 Maame Harris Tani (d. 1958), religious leader.
 Meiway (born in 1962), Ivorian musician

See also
Aby Lagoon

References

 Burmeister, Jonathan L. 1976. "A comparison of variable nouns in Anyi-Sanvi and Nzema."
 Egya-Blay. 1987. "Changing patterns of authority over children among the Western Nzema."
 Grottanelli, Vinigi L. (1988) The python killer: stories of Nzema life. Chicago: University of Chicago Press.
 Rowson, Hilary M. 1987. "Health and the gods in contemporary Nzema thought."
 Valsecchi, Pierluigi (1999) "Calendar and the annual festival in Nzema: notes on time and history", Africa (Instituto Italiano per l'Africa e l'Oriente), 54, 4, 489-513.
 Valsecchi, Pierluigi (2001) "The 'true Nzema': a layered identity", Africa (International Africa Institute), 71, 3, 391-425.

Ethnic groups in Ghana
Ethnic groups in Ivory Coast